St George's Hospital is a hospital in Wandsworth, London

St George's Hospital or St George Hospital could also refer to:

St. George's Leper Hospital, Copenhagen
St George's Hospital, Paphos, Cyprus
St George's Hospital, Havering, London
Saint George Hospital University Medical Center, Lebanon
St George's Hospital, Melbourne, Australia
St George's Hospital, Morpeth
St George Hospital, Mumbai
St George's Hospital, Christchurch, New Zealand, in the suburb of Strowan
St George's Hospital, Sheffield
St George's Hospital, Stafford
Saint Göran Hospital, Stockholm
St George Hospital, Sydney